Arish Mell is a small embayment and beach between Mupe and Worbarrow Bays in Dorset, England and is part of the Jurassic Coast and the South West Coast Path passes just to the north.  It is about  due south of Lulworth Castle and East Lulworth.  The bay is relatively inaccessible because it is within the Lulworth Ranges, an Army tank firing range, and although the Range Walks are open at most weekends and public holidays, there is no public access to the beach and cliffs.

History 
Arish Mell was the site of a series discharges pipes carrying effluent from the Winfrith Nuclear Power Station into the sea.

Geology 

Arish Mell forms a break in the line of chalk hills that form the Purbeck Ridge.

See also 
 List of Dorset beaches

Gallery

Isle of Purbeck
Bays of Dorset
Jurassic Coast